Maurice McCarthy may refer to:

 Maurice McCarthy (American football), American football player and coach
 Maurice McCarthy (Gaelic footballer) (1881–1962), Irish sportsperson